Scheemda (abbreviation: Sda) is an unstaffed railway station in Scheemda in the Netherlands. It is located on the Harlingen–Nieuweschans railway between Zuidbroek and Winschoten in the province of Groningen.

The station building was designed by Karel Hendrik van Brederode and completed in 1865. The train services started on 1 May 1868. Trains have been operated by Staatsspoorwegen (1868–1937), Nederlandse Spoorwegen (1938–2000), NoordNed (2000–2005), and Arriva (2005–present).

There are two tracks and an island platform at the station. Two local train services with trains in both directions call at Scheemda twice per hour. There are also connections to four regional bus services provided by Qbuzz.

Location 
The railway station is located at the Stationsstraat in the village of Scheemda, part of the municipality of Oldambt, in the east of the province of Groningen in the northeast of the Netherlands. It is situated on the Harlingen–Nieuweschans railway, also called Staatslijn B, between the railway stations of Zuidbroek and Winschoten. The Heiligerlee railway stop was situated between Scheemda and Winschoten from 1908 to 1934.

History 

The station building was completed in 1865. The station was opened on 1 May 1868, when train services started on the segment of the Harlingen–Nieuweschans railway between Groningen and Winschoten. At the time, the station was named Scheemda-Eexta.

Trains were operated by Maatschappij tot Exploitatie van Staatsspoorwegen (1868–1937), Nederlandse Spoorwegen (1938–2000), NoordNed (2000–2005), and Arriva (2005–present).

Building and layout 

The 19th-century station building is of the type SS 4th class, which was probably designed by architect Karel Hendrik van Brederode. Fifteen buildings of this type were built in the Netherlands between 1862 and 1890, of which seven remain today. The building has been a national heritage site since 2001.

The railway through Scheemda is unelectrified and oriented northwest to southeast. At the station, the single-track railway splits into two tracks. There is an island with two platforms that can be accessed via a level crossing. Platform 1 alongside the northern track is serving trains to Groningen and platform 2 alongside the southern track is serving trains to Winschoten. The station building is north of both tracks. Beyond the station, the tracks merge back into a single track.

Train services

Bus services

Notes

References

External links 

 Scheemda station, station information

1860s establishments in the Netherlands
Infrastructure completed in 1865
Railway stations in Groningen (province)
Railway stations on the Staatslijn B
Railway stations opened in 1868
Rijksmonuments in Groningen (province)
Transport in Oldambt (municipality)
Railway stations in the Netherlands opened in the 19th century